Chetan Baboor (April 22, 1974) is an Indian international Table Tennis champion and winner of the Arjuna Award for 1997 - an award recognizing outstanding achievement in sports in India. He belongs to the Babbur Kamme community of Holenarasipura, Karnataka. Chetan has won four national titles and double golds in Commonwealth Championships. He also competed at the three Olympic Games.

He was born in Lucknow, India and has represented Karnataka, Tamil Nadu and Petroleum Sports Control Board teams in India as well as BTK Enig in Sweden. Apart from  his sporting achievements, he has a Mechanical Engineering degree from Rashtreeya Vidyalaya College of Engineering and a MBA from Thunderbird School of Global Management.

He stopped playing pro tour in 2001 (at the age of 27) in order to pursue an MBA from Thunderbird university and has been working in Business/Management consulting since. He had a career best world ranking of 68 in 1999 and played his last big event (World Championships) in 2004.

He currently resides in Bangalore/New York, NY and is currently a presenter for the Asian Games, presenting for the TV channel Ten Sports. He is currently working at Axtria Inc. as an Associate Principal.

References

Indian male table tennis players
Recipients of the Arjuna Award
People from Hassan district
Living people
Racket sportspeople from Karnataka
Commonwealth Games medallists in table tennis
Commonwealth Games bronze medallists for India
Year of birth missing (living people)
Table tennis players at the 2002 Commonwealth Games
Olympic table tennis players of India
Table tennis players at the 1992 Summer Olympics
Table tennis players at the 1996 Summer Olympics
Table tennis players at the 2000 Summer Olympics
20th-century Indian people
21st-century Indian people
Medallists at the 2002 Commonwealth Games